Ronja may refer to:

 Ronia the Robber's Daughter (Ronja Rövardotter), a children's book by Astrid Lindgren
 Reasonable Optical Near Joint Access, an optical point-to-point Free Space Optics data link
 Ronja (given name), the name Ronja.